Elton Thomas Jantjies (born 1 August 1990) is a South African professional rugby union player for the South Africa national team, Agen in the Top 14 and the  in the Currie Cup.

Jantjies made his professional debut with the Lions (Super Rugby) during the 2011 Super Rugby season, and his International debut with the Springboks during the inaugural Rugby Championship. He has received several significant sporting awards, including the SARU Young Player of the Year award (2010), and the SA U20 Player of the Year award (2010).

In June 2014 it was reported that Jantjies had signed a contract with Japanese side NTT Communications Shining Arcs who play in the Top League. This move meant that he would be ruled out for the 2014 Currie Cup Premier Division competition.

Domestic career

Golden Lions: 2011–14
Jantjies gained a reputation as being a clutch performer after he successfully converted every goal attempt in the 2011 Currie Cup final, a game in which the Golden Lions defeated the Sharks 42–16. This performance earned him the Man of the Match award.

Super Rugby: 2011–2020
Jantjies made his Super Rugby debut in 2011 for the Lions. He joined the Stormers for the 2013 season on a loan deal after the Lions were relegated from the South African conference. His stint with the Stormers was largely unsuccessful compared to the previous season with the Lions where he had an 86% goal-kicking success rate. He returned to the Lions who had won promotion back to the Super Rugby competition.

Jantjies reached the finals with the Lions in both 2016 where the Lions lost to the Hurricanes in Wellington and 2017 where they lost to the Crusaders at their home crowd in Johannesburg, playing a huge part in getting them there. Jantjies was also the highest points scorer in the competition in 2017, scoring 203 points that season.

International career
Jantjies made his international rugby test debut for the South Africa national rugby union team during the inaugural Rugby Championship against Australia on 29 September 2012, at Loftus Versfeld, however his debut for the Springboks came in a non-test, uncapped game against the Barbarians in the 2010 end of year tests.

Jantjies was named in South Africa's squad for the 2019 Rugby World Cup. South Africa went on to win the tournament, defeating England in the final.

International tries 
As of 26 August 2017.

Personal life
He is the older brother of fly-half Tony Jantjies.
Weeks before he joined the Stormers, his father Thomas Jantjies died in hospital after being stung by a bee. In previous interviews, Jantjies had described his father as his mentor and kicking coach.

Jantjies was suspended from the Springboks squad in September 2022 while in Buenos Aires after allegations surfaced of inappropriate behaviour with Zeenat Simjee, the Springboks dietician. It was reported that he spent a night away from the team at a separate hotel during the test series against New Zealand (a highly unusual practice for athletes) where patrons allegedly heard the two having sexual encounters and then arguing. He left without paying the hotel bill, only paying the outstanding charges weeks later. Jantjies is married to Iva Ristic, who is the mother of his 3 children. The Springbok press release on 11 September 2022 stated:

References

External links
 
 
 IRB JWC Player Profile

South African rugby union players
South Africa international rugby union players
Golden Lions players
Lions (United Rugby Championship) players
Stormers players
Rugby union fly-halves
1990 births
Cape Coloureds
Living people
People from Graaff-Reinet
South Africa Under-20 international rugby union players
South African expatriate rugby union players
Expatriate rugby union players in Japan
Expatriate rugby union players in France
South African expatriate sportspeople in Japan
South African expatriate sportspeople in France
Urayasu D-Rocks players
Section Paloise players
NTT DoCoMo Red Hurricanes Osaka players
SU Agen Lot-et-Garonne players
Rugby union players from the Eastern Cape